The Prix Jean Gabin was a French award presented each year between 1981 and 2006 to a young and upcoming actor working in the French film industry.

The award was created on the initiative of Louis de Funès (1914–1983) in 1981, as a tribute to the late Jean Gabin (1904–1976). It was renamed the Prix Patrick Dewaere in 2008, following a dispute between the organisers and the daughter of Jean Gabin.

The counterpart of Prix Jean Gabin, the Prix Romy Schneider, is awarded to an actress each year in Paris since 1984.

Recipients

References

External links
 
 

French film awards
Awards established in 1981
Awards disestablished in 2006